Liberia is a canton in the Guanacaste province of Costa Rica. The head city is in Liberia district.

History 
Liberia was created on 7 December 1848 by decree 167.

Geography 

Liberia has an area of  km2 and a mean elevation of  metres.
Prominent geologic features of Liberia include Cerro Cacao (Cacao Mountain) and Rincón de la Vieja. The latter is the center of the Rincón de la Vieja Volcano National Park. The canton also includes the most visited portion of Santa Rosa National Park on its northwest border. The Río Salto delineates the southwestern border as far as the Tempisque River, and the Tempisque forms the border on the southeast as far as the Bahía Naranjo (Orange Bay).

Districts 
The canton of Liberia is subdivided into the following districts:
 Liberia
 Cañas Dulces
 Mayorga
 Nacascolo
 Curubandé

Demographics 

For the 2011 census, Liberia had a population of  inhabitants.
Besides hosting the provincial capital, Liberia Canton is the most populous of Guanacaste's nine cantons.

Transportation

Road transportation 
The canton is covered by the following road routes:

Airports 
 Daniel Oduber Quirós International Airport is located in this canton.

References 

Cantons of Guanacaste Province
Populated places in Guanacaste Province